Thompson Oliha  (4 October 1968 – 30 June 2013) was a Nigerian professional footballer who played as a midfielder for clubs in Africa and Europe during an injury-shortened career.

Club career
Oliha played for Bendel Insurance (1985–1987), Iwuanyanwu Nationale (1988–1991), Africa Sports (1992–1993), Maccabi Ironi Ashdod (1993–1994) and Antalyaspor (1994–1995). As a player, he was known for his powerful shots and abilities in the air. Oliha retired at the age of 27, as a result of a serious knee injury.

International career
Oliha made a total of 31 appearances for the full Nigeria national team, scoring two goals. He made his international debut in 1990, in a game against Senegal and made his last appearance at the 1994 FIFA World Cup, as a late substitute against Italy.

Oliha also played at the 1987 FIFA World Youth Championship.

Death
Oliha died due to complications from malaria on 30 June 2013. At the time of his death he was an assistant coach for the Kwara Football Academy.

References

External links
 

1968 births
2013 deaths
Sportspeople from Benin City
Association football midfielders
Nigerian footballers
Nigeria under-20 international footballers
Nigeria international footballers
Africa Cup of Nations-winning players
1990 African Cup of Nations players
1992 African Cup of Nations players
1994 African Cup of Nations players
1994 FIFA World Cup players
Bendel Insurance F.C. players
Heartland F.C. players
Africa Sports d'Abidjan players
Maccabi Ironi Ashdod F.C. players
Antalyaspor footballers
Süper Lig players
Nigerian expatriate footballers
Expatriate footballers in Ivory Coast
Expatriate footballers in Israel
Expatriate footballers in Turkey
Nigerian expatriate sportspeople in Ivory Coast
Nigerian expatriate sportspeople in Turkey
Nigerian expatriate sportspeople in Israel
Deaths from malaria